The 1997 Seniors Pot Black was a one-off invitational snooker tournament of the popular series Pot Black. Recording took place during early 1997 and broadcast in March. The tournament was held at Goodwood House in Chichester, Sussex. It featured 12 veteran players in a knock-out system both aged over 40. All matches until the final were one-frame shoot-outs and the final being contested over the best of three frames.

Broadcasts were shown on teatime daily on BBC2 and the series started at 17:30 on Monday 3 March 1997. David Vine presented the programme and Ted Lowe and Clive Everton were the commentators while there were more referees in this event than previously. Alan Chamberian and John Newton joined long time referee John Williams.

The players were all over 40 years of age. Some had retired from the game and some were still competing in tournaments. All the previous Pot Black champions over 40 were there including Ray Reardon, John Spencer and Eddie Charlton. Joe Johnson who never competed in any previous series of Pot Black won the title beating Terry Griffiths 2–0 to become the only champion of Seniors Pot Black.

Main draw

Round 1

Final

References

Pot Black
Snooker competitions in England
1997 in snooker
1997 in English sport
Senior sports competitions
Chichester
Sport in Chichester